Clarence Rhodes Budlong (September 3, 1874 – January 25, 1946) was an American tennis player active in the late 19th century.

Tennis career
Budlong reached the quarterfinals of the U.S. National Championships in 1895 and 1898.

References

External links 

American male tennis players
1874 births
1946 deaths
Tennis people from Rhode Island